The 1983–84 Calgary Flames season was the fourth season in Calgary and 12th for the Flames franchise in the National Hockey League.  The Flames finished in second place in the Smythe Division, earning a first round playoff match-up against the Vancouver Canucks.  Calgary defeated Vancouver in four games to face the top team in the NHL, the Edmonton Oilers.  The Flames took the series to the maximum seven games, ultimately falling to the Oilers in the seventh game by a 7–4 score.

The Flames moved into their new arena, the Olympic Saddledome after spending their first three seasons playing out of the Stampede Corral.  Built at a cost of $100 million CAD, the Saddledome was also set to serve as a venue for the 1988 Winter Olympics.  The arena's distinctive roof lent itself to the arena's name.  The first game was played on October 15, 1983, against the Edmonton Oilers.  The Oilers would win the game 4–3.

Also debuting for the Flames in 1983–84 was the team's mascot, Harvey the Hound.  Harvey became the first mascot in the NHL when he debuted February 16, 1984.  Harvey was also briefly the mascot of the Calgary Stampeders of the Canadian Football League, but would later be replaced by the Stamps with their own mascot, Ralph the Dog.

Lanny McDonald was the Flames lone representative at the 1984 All-Star Game, while both Hakan Loob and Jamie Macoun were named to the NHL's All-Rookie team.

Regular season

Season standings

Schedule and results

Playoffs

Player statistics

Skaters
Note: GP = Games played; G = Goals; A = Assists; Pts = Points; PIM = Penalty minutes

†Denotes player spent time with another team before joining Calgary.  Stats reflect time with the Flames only.
‡Traded mid-season.

Goaltenders
Note: GP = Games played; TOI = Time on ice (minutes); W = Wins; L = Losses; OT = Overtime/shootout losses; GA = Goals against; SO = Shutouts; GAA = Goals against average

Transactions
The Flames were involved in the following transactions during the 1983–84 season.

Trades

Free agents

Waivers

Draft picks

Calgary's picks at the 1983 NHL Entry Draft, held in Montreal, Quebec.

See also
1983–84 NHL season

References

Player stats: 2007–08 Calgary Flames Media Guide, p. 128.
Game log: 2007–08 Calgary Flames Media Guide, p. 140.
Team standings:  1983–84 NHL standings @hockeydb.com
Trades: Individual player pages at hockeydb.com

Calgary Flames seasons
Calgary Flames season, 1983-84
Calg